The 18th Grand Prix des Frontières was a Formula One motor race held on 5 June 1949 at the Chimay Street Circuit in Chimay, Belgium. The Grand Prix was won by Guy Mairesse in a Talbot-Lago T26C, setting fastest lap also. Lance Macklin finished second in a Maserati 6CM and Johnny Claes was third in another T26C.

Classification

Race

References

Grand Prix des Frontières
Frontières
Frontières
Frontières